Pope Sixtus I (42 – 124/126/128), also spelled Xystus, a Roman of Greek descent, was the bishop of Rome from c. 115 to his death. He succeeded Alexander I and was in turn succeeded by Telesphorus. His feast is celebrated on 6 April.

Name 
The oldest documents use the spelling Xystus (from the Greek ξυστός, xystos, "shaved") in reference to the first three popes of that name. Pope Sixtus I was also the sixth Pope after Peter, leading to questions as to whether the name "Sixtus" is derived from sextus, Latin for "sixth".

The "Xystus" mentioned in the Catholic Canon of the Mass is Xystus II, not Xystus I.

Biography 
The Holy See's Annuario Pontificio (2012) identifies him as a Roman by birth, who served from 117 or 119 to 126 or 128. His father's name was Pastor. 

According to the Liberian Catalogue of popes, he served the Church during the reign of Hadrian "from the consulate of Niger and Apronianus until that of Verus III and Ambibulus", that is, from 117 to 126. Eusebius states in his Chronicon that Sixtus I reigned from 114 to 124, while his Historia Ecclesiastica, using a different catalogue of popes, claims his rule from 114 to 128. All authorities agree that he reigned about ten years. 

Like most of his predecessors, Sixtus I was believed to have been buried near Peter's grave on Vatican Hill, although there are differing traditions concerning where his body lies today. In Alife, there is a Romanesque crypt, which houses the relics of Pope Sixtus I, brought there by Rainulf III. Alban Butler (Lives of the Saints, 6 April) states that Clement X gave some of his relics to Cardinal de Retz, who placed them in the Abbey of Saint Michael in Lorraine.

Liturgical codification 
Sixtus I instituted several Catholic liturgical and administrative traditions. According to the Liber Pontificalis (ed. Duchesne, I.128), he passed the following three ordinances:
 that none but sacred ministers are allowed to touch the sacred vessels;
 that bishops who have been summoned to the Holy See shall, upon their return, not be received by their diocese except on presenting Apostolic letters;
 that after the Preface in the Mass, the priest shall recite the Sanctus with the people.

See also

List of Catholic saints
List of popes
Pope Saint Sixtus I, patron saint archive

References

Bibliography 

 Benedict XVI. The Roman Martyrology. Gardners Books, 2007. .
 Chapman, John. Studies on the Early Papacy. Port Washington, NY: Kennikat Press, 1971. .
 Fortescue, Adrian, and Scott M. P. Reid. The Early Papacy: To the Synod of Chalcedon in 451. Southampton: Saint Austin Press, 1997. .
 Jowett, George F. The Drama of the Lost Disciples. London: Covenant Pub. Co, 1968. 
 Loomis, Louise Ropes. The Book of Popes (Liber Pontificalis). Merchantville, NJ: Evolution Publishing. .

External links 

 Image of Pope Saint Sixtus as seen on a fresco at Chalivoy-Milon in the Berry.
 
 Collected works in Migne Patrologia Latina

42 births
124 deaths
2nd-century archbishops
2nd-century Christian saints
2nd-century Romans
Italian popes
Italian saints
Papal saints
Clergy from Rome
Popes
Year of birth unknown
2nd-century popes